The 2023 Rice Owls football team represented Rice University and will compete in their first season as members of the American Athletic Conference (AAC). during the 2023 NCAA Division I FBS football season. They are led by head coach Mike Bloomgren, who was coaching his sixth season with the team. The Owls play their home games at the Rice Stadium in Houston, Texas.

Previous season

In October 2021, Rice accepted the invitation to join the American Athletic Conference (AAC), scheduled to become a full-member on July 1, 2023. The 2022 season was expected to be the program's last season as a member of Conference USA.

The Owls finished the 2022 season 5–8, 3–5 in Conference USA play to finish in seventh place in the conference. They lost to Southern Miss 38–24 in the LendingTree Bowl.

Schedule
Rice and the American Athletic Conference (AAC) announced the 2023 football schedule on February 21, 2023.

References

Rice
Rice Owls football seasons
Rice Owls football